Edward Saunders may refer to:

Edward W. Saunders (1860–1921), Virginian politician
Edward Saunders (judge) (died 1576), British judge
Edward Saunders (entomologist) (1848–1910), British entomologist
Edward Saunders (MP) for Coventry (UK Parliament constituency)

See also
Ed Saunders (disambiguation)
Ted Saunders (disambiguation)